"Going Deep" is a song by British electronic act Chicane.

Going Deep may also refer to:
 Going Deep with Amani and Dan, a program on NBC Sports Radio
 Going Deep with David Rees, a television program

See also 
 "Go Deep", a song by Janet Jackson